The Akaflieg Karlsruhe AK-1 Mischl  is a Motor-glider designed and built in Germany and first flown on 9 January 1971.

Specifications

References

External links

1970s German sailplanes
Akaflieg Karlsruhe aircraft
Aircraft first flown in 1971
Motor gliders